Siham Es Sad (born 2 August 2000) is a Moroccan professional racing cyclist. She rode in the women's time trial event at the 2020 UCI Road World Championships.

References

2000 births
Living people
Moroccan female cyclists
Place of birth missing (living people)